Vanini may refer to:
 Lucilio Vanini, also known under the pen name Giulio Cesare Vanini (1585-1619), Italian freethinker
 Vanina Vanini, novella by Stendhal
 Vanini (Brazil), municipality in Rio Grande do Sul